A Lost Leader is a 1906 politically-themed novel by British writer E. Phillips Oppenheim. Later better known for his thrillers, it was one of several novels Oppenheim wrote at the time centred on "social political life". In it, a potential Liberal Party politician, Lawrence Mannering, is lured back from his country estate to London to revive the party's fortunes.

Adaptation
In 1922 it was adapted into a British silent film of the same title directed by George Ridgwell and starring Robert English, Dorothy Fane and George Bellamy.

References

Bibliography
 Goble, Alan. The Complete Index to Literary Sources in Film. Walter de Gruyter, 1999.
 Reilly, John M. Twentieth Century Crime & Mystery Writers. Springer, 2015.
 Server, Lee. Encyclopedia of Pulp Fiction Writers. Infobase Publishing, 2014.

1906 British novels
Novels by E. Phillips Oppenheim
Novels set in England
Novels set in London
Ward, Lock & Co. books
British novels adapted into films